Brunswick Transit Alternative was the transit agency serving the city of Brunswick, Ohio.  It operates two transit bus routes, the Red Line through the northern section of the city and the Green Line through the southern section of the city. In January 2017, BTA was absorbed by Medina County Public Transit.

Connecting services
Greater Cleveland Regional Transit Authority, a neighboring transit agency, provides connecting services.

References

Bus transportation in Ohio
Transportation in Medina County, Ohio
Transit agencies in Ohio